Manbuta is a genus of moths in the family Erebidae. The genus was erected by Francis Walker in 1865.

Species
Manbuta calgia (Schaus, 1901) Brazil (Paraná)
Manbuta devia Walker, 1865 Brazil (Amazonas)
Manbuta endocharagma Hampson, 1926 Peru
Manbuta melanesia Hampson, 1926 Peru
Manbuta nephelica Hampson, 1926 Peru
Manbuta nephrosema Hampson, 1926 Peru
Manbuta niphosema Hampson, 1926 Peru
Manbuta ochrosema Hampson, 1926 Paraguay
Manbuta ocresia (Schaus, 1914) French Guiana
Manbuta orthogramma Hampson, 1926 Peru
Manbuta pyraliformis (Walker, 1858) Florida, Antilles
Manbuta rhomboidalis Hampson, 1926 Peru

References

Eulepidotinae
Moth genera